Caladenia hoffmanii, commonly known as Hoffman's spider orchid is a species of orchid endemic to the south-west of Western Australia. It has a single, hairy leaf and one or two, greenish-yellow, red and white flowers which have a greenish-yellow labellum with a red tip. It is distinguished from the Pingaring spider orchid (Caladenia graniticola) by small differences in the labellum and more northerly distribution.

Description
The lateral sepals are about the same size as the dorsal sepal but curve downwards. The tip is dark red and curves downward (but not under). There are four close rows of red calli along the centre of the labellum, gradually decreasing in size towards the tip. Flowering occurs from August to September. Caladenia graniticola has larger calli, a more southerly distribution and different habitat.

Taxonomy and naming
Caladenia hoffmanii was first described in 2001 by Stephen Hopper and Andrew Phillip Brown from a specimen collected in the Morseby Range and the description was published in Nuytsia. The specific epithet (hoffmanii) honours Noel Hoffman, the author of books about Western Australian orchids.

Distribution and habitat
Hoffman's spider orchid occurs between Geraldton and the Murchison River in the Geraldton Sandplains biogeographic region where it grows under dense shrubs on rocky hillsides.

Conservation
Caladenia hoffmanii is classified as "Threatened Flora (Declared Rare Flora — Extant)" by the Western Australian Government Department of Parks and Wildlife  and it has also been listed as "Endangered" (EN) under the Australian Government Environment Protection and Biodiversity Conservation Act 1999 (EPBC Act). The main threats to the species are grazing by feral pigs (Sus scrofa), by rabbits (Oryctolagus cuniculus) and inappropriate fire regimes.

References

hoffmanii
Orchids of Western Australia
Endemic orchids of Australia
Plants described in 2001
Endemic flora of Western Australia
Taxa named by Stephen Hopper
Taxa named by Andrew Phillip Brown